The 1904 Illinois gubernatorial election was held on November 8, 1904.

Incumbent Republican Governor Richard Yates Jr. was denied renomination by his party.

Republican nominee Charles S. Deneen defeated Democratic nominee Lawrence B. Stringer with 59.09% of the vote.

Democratic nomination

Candidates
Lawrence B. Stringer of Lincoln, State Senator

Results
The Democratic state convention was held on June 15, 1904, at the State Armory in Springfield.

Republican nomination

Candidates
Charles S. Deneen of Chicago, Cook County State's attorney and former State Representative
Howland J. Hamlin of Shelbyville, Illinois Attorney General (withdrew after 78th ballot)
Frank O. Lowden of Chicago, former professor of law at Northwestern University
John H. Pierce of Kewanee, president of the Western Tube Company (put into nomination before 3rd ballot) (withdrew after 78th ballot)
Lawrence Y. Sherman of Macomb, State Representative (withdrew after 49th ballot, returned before 57th ballot) (withdrew after 78th ballot)
Vespasian Warner of Clinton, U.S. Representative for the 19th district
Richard Yates Jr. of Jacksonville, incumbent Governor (withdrew after 78th ballot)

Results
The Republican state convention was held from May 12 to 20 and, following a recess, from May 31 to June 3, 1904, at the State Armory in Springfield.

The results of the balloting were as follows (fractions ignored until 39th ballot):

Following the 79th ballot, Lowden moved that the nomination of Deneen be made unanimous, which was carried viva voce.

General election

Candidates
Lawrence B. Stringer, Democratic
Charles S. Deneen, Republican 
John Collins, Socialist, candidate for Mayor of Chicago in 1901
James Hogan, Populist, candidate for the 1st district in 1898
Robert H. Patton, Prohibition, candidate for the 13th district in 1890
Andrew G. Specht, Continental
Philip Veal, Socialist Labor, party organizer

Results

See also
1904 Illinois lieutenant gubernatorial election

References

Bibliography

Governor
1904
Illinois
November 1904 events